Höfflin is a surname. Notable people with the surname include: 

Mirko Höfflin (born 1992), German ice hockey player
Sarah Höfflin (born 1991), Swiss skier

German-language surnames